Juan José Viedma Schenkhuizen (born 27 October 1974), known as Viedma, is a Dutch retired footballer who played as a defensive midfielder or a central defender.

Club career
Viedma was born in Heemskerk, North Holland. During his career, the son of a Spanish immigrant represented in his country NEC Nijmegen, RBC Roosendaal (promoting to the Eredivisie in his debut season) and FC Omniworld, still playing afterwards with VV Katwijk and FC Uitgeest at amateur level; both major divisions combined, he appeared in 140 matches and scored four times.

During five years, Viedma competed in his ancestor's homeland with SD Compostela, amassing La Liga totals of 41 games and two goals in his first two seasons. The rest was spent in the second tier, being used almost exclusively as a backup.

References

External links
Stats at Voetbal International 

1974 births
Living people
People from Heemskerk
Dutch people of Spanish descent
Dutch footballers
Association football defenders
Association football midfielders
Eerste Divisie players
Eredivisie players
NEC Nijmegen players
RBC Roosendaal players
Almere City FC players
VV Katwijk players
La Liga players
Segunda División players
SD Compostela footballers
Dutch expatriate footballers
Expatriate footballers in Spain
Dutch expatriate sportspeople in Spain
Footballers from North Holland